Mugithi music is a form of music originated by the Kikuyu people of Kenya but enjoyed by other ethnic groups within Kenya and even some non-Kenyans in countries with a large Kenyan diaspora such as the United Kingdom.

It is usually sung by a single singer and accompanied by guitars (either acoustic or usually quite highly pitched electric guitars).  Songs are always sung in the Gikuyu language.

The music tackles a wide range of subjects and includes a good degree of social commentary and sometimes political comment.

The singers are distinctive for their adoption of the styling of Country music singers that had an influence on the development of the music in previous decades. Singers like the lateSalim junior have become household names. Others like Mike Rua are big kenyan benga artists. The mugithi artists have in recent times redone and recorded old kikuyu benga music to accommodate newer audiences.

When the song 'Mugithi' is sang, the people in the audience usually make a line and dance while walking around. Mugithi is a Common phenomena in weddings, dowry events, local night clubs and other celebrations. The name mugithi means train hence the dancing style involving holding on to each others hips wriggling as they go in circles. The first mugithi song was a gospel song 'mugithi uyu wa matuini' translated from English song Glory train.

References 

  http://www.nation.co.ke/News/Resilience-of-a-musical-sound-as-Mugithi-wafts-across-land-/-/1056/1056834/-/ycklngz/-/index.html
  http://www.standardmedia.co.ke/?articleID=2000030913&story_title=Mugithi:-Scholar-unravels-popular-music-roots-and-lewd-lyrics
  http://www.the-star.co.ke/news/article-80347/producer-explores-link-between-kikuyu-and-american-country-music

Music genres